Dilkusha is a residential colony in Lucknow, the capital city of Uttar Pradesh, India. Near the banks of the River Gomti, the colony has been the residence of government officials for more than a hundred years. Dilkusha is situated 2 km from Hazratganj in central Lucknow, and is close to amenities and schools such as Loreto and La Martiniere. Dilkusha means "my heart is happy".

The palace of Dilkusha Kothi, the oldest building in the colony, was built in the eighteenth century by Nawab Saadat Ali Khan (1798-1814). The palace (now a ruin) formerly served as a hunting lodge for British officers and nawabs. Dilkusha Kothi was an Indianised English baroque style building, but was damaged considerably during the First War of Indian Independence in 1857.

Today the colony is completely owned by the government of Uttar Pradesh. The residences are divided into A, B, C, PW and EH (the last two being completely reserved for the officers of the Public Works Department of Uttar Pradesh with PW - referring to Public Works and EH to "Experimental Housing" being one of the few multistory government housing). The colony for the most part is close-knit, with journalists, academics, IAS, PCS and other government officials living here. There is a recreation club for the residents of the colony.

References

External links
Photograph of the ruined Dilkusha Kothi
Pincode of Dilkusha

Neighbourhoods in Lucknow